Theodorus Johannes Franciscus Brokmann Jr. (3 July 1922 – 24 December 2003), better known as Theo Brokmann, was a Dutch football player.

Club career
He made his debut for Ajax Amsterdam, after the beginning of World War II. He would be a starting line-up player until 1947 when he was replaced by then 17 year old Rinus Michels. He played 126 matches and scored 79 goals, one more than his father Theo Brokmann Sr. He died in December 2003 at the age of 81.

References

1922 births
2003 deaths
AFC Ajax players
Association football forwards
Dutch footballers
Footballers from Amsterdam